Iddrisu Zakari Alidu is a Ghanaian politician and an MP for Walewale. He is a member of the National Democratic Congress.(NDC).

Early life and education 
Zakari was born on 6 March 1956 in Janga his hometown in the Northern Region of Ghana. He attended the University of Education, Winneba where he graduated with his Bachelor of Education in Accounting and also attend Ghana Institute of Management and Public Administration (GIMPA) located at Achimota in Accra for his Executive Masters in Governance and Leadership(EMGL) in 2008.

Career 
Zakari is an teacher by profession.

Political life 
Zakari was elected on the ticket of the National Democratic Congress (NDC) to represent the Walewale constituency after winning with 11,355 votes during the 2004 Ghanaian general election. He had a total of 35.30% of all votes cast during the 2004 elections and won to represent the Walewale constituency. He contested again and won in the 2008 Ghanaian general election which gave him the opportunity to represent his constituency for the second time.

Personal life 
He is married with nine children and is a Muslim.

References 

University of Education, Winneba alumni
National Democratic Congress (Ghana) politicians
1956 births
Living people
Ghanaian MPs 2005–2009
Ghanaian MPs 2009–2013